Andrew Raymond Gordon Fraser (born 19 December 1952), an Australian politician, was a member of the New South Wales Legislative Assembly from 1990 to 2019, representing Coffs Harbour for the Nationals.

Fraser was educated in Newcastle at Kahibah Primary and Whitebridge High Schools. He has worked in finance industry and as an insurance broker and has been the proprietor of a take-away food shop and of a caravan park. He is married with three children.

Fraser is noted for chasing and grabbing then Minister for Roads, Joe Tripodi, on the floor of the House in September 2005, apparently in relation to a lack of funding for the main roads, including the Pacific Highway in Coffs Harbour. The ABC's coverage of the 2007 election included the caption "Andrew Fraser the strangler won." He became deputy leader of the NSW Nationals in March 2007, before he was deposed during a leadership spill in October 2008.

On 3 December 2008, Fraser resigned from the shadow ministry after pushing fellow Nationals MP Katrina Hodgkinson in the Legislative Assembly. Hodgkinson was trying to move Fraser away from a verbal confrontation with Labor MP John Aquilina.

References

 

1952 births
Living people
Members of the New South Wales Legislative Assembly
Deputy and Assistant Speakers of the New South Wales Legislative Assembly
National Party of Australia members of the Parliament of New South Wales
21st-century Australian politicians